Walter Silva (born January 4, 1977) is a Mexican professional baseball pitcher who is a free agent. He played in Major League Baseball (MLB) for the San Diego Padres.

Career

Mexican League/San Diego Padres
Silva played in the Mexican League from 2002 to 2008. On February 21, 2009 Silva was invited to spring training by the San Diego Padres. After a good spring he made the opening day roster as the team's third starter in the pitching rotation.

Silva made his Major League debut on April 8, 2009, against the Los Angeles Dodgers. He pitched five innings allowing two runs on five hits with a strikeout, and earned the no decision, leaving the game tied at 2–2.

Silva was the starting pitcher for the visiting Padres in the first Major League baseball game at the New York Mets' new ballpark, Citi Field, April 13, 2009.  He pitched 4.2 innings, giving up five runs on five hits, and striking out two.  The Padres won the game, but Silva did not get the decision.

On July 7, he was designated for assignment by the Padres after going 0–2 with an 8.76 ERA in 6 starts.

Second Stint in Mexican League
In 2010, he returned to the Mexican League with the Sultanes de Monterrey, for whom he played for through the 2015 season.

On April 12, 2016, he was traded to the Vaqueros Laguna from the Toros de Tijuana.

On March 18, 2017, he was traded to the Bravos de León from the Vaqueros Laguna.

Silva did not play in a game in 2020 due to the cancellation of the Mexican League season because of the COVID-19 pandemic. He was released by the Bravos on March 9, 2021.

On June 11, 2021, Silva signed with the Generales de Durango of the Mexican League. He was released on November 23, 2021.

International career
After the 2020 season, he played for Panama in the 2021 Caribbean Series.

References

External links

Retrosheet
Mexican League
Venezuela Winter League

1977 births
Living people
Algodoneros de Guasave players
Baseball players from Sinaloa
Bravos de León players
Broncos de Reynosa players
Central American and Caribbean Games bronze medalists for Mexico
Central American and Caribbean Games medalists in baseball
Competitors at the 2006 Central American and Caribbean Games
Major League Baseball pitchers
Major League Baseball players from Mexico
Mexican expatriate baseball players in the United States
Mexican League baseball pitchers
Portland Beavers players
San Diego Padres players
Sportspeople from Mazatlán
Sultanes de Monterrey players
Tigres de Aragua players
Mexican expatriate baseball players in Venezuela
Toros de Tijuana players
Tuneros de San Luis Potosí players
Vaqueros Laguna players
Venados de Mazatlán players
Expatriate baseball players in Panama
Mexican expatriate sportspeople in Panama